Alkiviadis Christofi (Greek: Αλκιβιάδης Χριστοφή born 20 January 1992) is a Cypriot professional footballer who is playing for Karmiotissa FC as of 2014.

Before the new season, he took part in four preseason friendlies at an opulent resort in Maribor, Slovenia.

References

External links
 

Cypriot footballers
Karmiotissa FC players
Association football midfielders
Living people
1992 births